Tai Po  is an area in the New Territories of Hong Kong. It refers to the vicinity of the traditional market towns in the area presently known as Tai Po Old Market or Tai Po Kau Hui (the original "Tai Po Market") on the north of Lam Tsuen River and the Tai Po Hui (the current Tai Po Market; historically Tai Wo Shi, literally Tai Wo market) on Fu Shin Street on the south of the Lam Tsuen River, near the old Tai Po Market railway station of the Kowloon-Canton Railway (British Section). Both market towns became part of the Tai Po New Town in the late 1970s and early 1980s. In present-day usage, "Tai Po" may refer to the area around the original market towns, the Tai Po New Town, or the entire Tai Po District.

Etymology
Treating the Chinese characters separately, the pronounce of Po in the third tone in Cantonese are shared with many words, not only Po in the sixth tone. For example, the "Po" of Sham Shui Po, literally deep water port. As a coincidence, Tai Po is a seashore town. The name Tai Po Hoi was appeared in Nanhai Zhi of the Yuan dynasty (1271 to 1368 of Gregorian calendar), which stated that pearl was the product of the Tai Po sea. In Ming dynasty's , recorded the names Tai Po Hoi and Tai Po Tau. In the attached map of that book, the sea next to Tai Po Tau was labelled with "can shelter hurricane". In early Qing dynasty Kangxi 27th Year edition of Xin'an Xianzhi (literally Gazetteer of the Xin'an County), Tai Po Tau Hui as market centre, Tai Po Tau as village (under the administration of ) and Tai Po Hoi as water body, were recorded. According to Hong Kong sinologist and historian Jao Tsung-I, the character Po in Tai Po, should interpreted as port or sea side.

However, there was another urban legend version of the meaning of Tai Po. In the urban legend, the area around Tai Po was a habitat of wild animal, which people have to "Big-Step".

History

Tai Po as a populated place, could be traced back to the Stone Age. Archaeological site in Yuen Chau Tsai, had discovered stone axe and pottery which was believed to be made in Neolithic era. The indigenous inhabitants of Tai Po lived by clamming and pearl farming in Tai Po Hoi (literally Tai Po Sea; Tolo Harbour) since at least AD 963. The pearl making business reached its peak during the Song dynasty and started to decline gradually in the midst of the Ming dynasty. Tai Po had been developed as a fishing port around the late Ming dynasty and the Qing dynasty. While a village that belong to the modern day Tai Po area, Wun Yiu, had developed into a center of porcelain industry in the Ming dynasty.

Tang clan migrated from the area north of the border of the modern day Hong Kong to the modern day the New Territories of Hong Kong in the Song dynasty of China. A branch of Tang clan was split from Lung Yeuk Tau of the modern day the New Territories, to establish the village in Tai Po Tau. The Tai Po Tau branch and Lung Yeuk Tau branch also founded the first Tai Po Hui the market town (also known as Tai Po Tau Hui), despite it is now defunct and the area now known as Tai Po Old Market. The area around the first market town, also lived other people that were not from the Tang clan. They formed an inter-villages alliance  (literally Tai Po Seven Alliances; each alliance contained one or more villages). The inter-villages alliance founded another market town Tai Wo Shi (literally Tai Wo market) after the Qing government ruled that Tai Po Hui (Tai Po Tau Hui) was belonged to Tangs, other clans cannot open shops in Tang's market town. However, Tai Wo Shi replaced the original Tai Po Hui (Tai Po Tau Hui) as the main market, and took the name Tai Po Hui (anglicized as Tai Po Market). The old market town thus became Tai Po Kau Hui (anglicized as Tai Po Old Market).

During the British colonial rule, a District Office, a police station, two railway stations: Tai Po Market railway station and Tai Po Kau railway station (in Tai Po Kau) and other public facilities were built with-in the modern day area that belong to the new town and the administrative district. Most of them in close distance with the market town of Tai Po at that time.

In the 1970s, the Hong Kong government began to develop satellite towns: Tai Po Industrial Estate, the first industrial estate in Hong Kong was built in the reclaimed land of the former Tai Po Hoi in 1974; Tai Po was named as a site to built "new town" in 1979, which the government obtain lands by reclamation of the river mouth and Tai Po Hoi. The new town was also designed to incorporate and interact with the existing market town. The first public housing estate of Tai Po New Town: Tai Yuen Estate – was established in 1981. The population has soared to 320,000, and Tai Po New Town began to prosper following the completion of the Tolo Highway which were integrated with the older urban areas.

At present, due to the development of the new town, the place name Tai Po may refer to Tai Po New Town or the historical area centre Tai Po Market, or the Tai Po District (excluding exclave Sai Kung North) that cover the new town and Lam Tsuen Valley and other area. However, the boundary of Tai Po was not defined. In contrast, a namesake election constituency of Tai Po Market had its legally defined boundary, as well as Tai Po District; Tai Po New Town also had its officially defined boundary in urban planning regulation and law. Moreover, Hong Kong police, as well as primary and secondary schools district, had their own boundaries.

Education

In historical eras clan villages organised private study halls or sishu. King Law Ka Shuk, is a declared monument of Hong Kong. It is the ancestral hall of Tang clan Tai Po Tau branch, and historically a study hall. Village schools opened with government subsidies in the early 20th century. In the 1920s and 1930s secondary schools in the vernacular medium opened in Tai Po. Many village schools opened after World War II. Due to a decline in the birthrate, by the 1990s the number of school students was declining and many village schools began to close.

In present day, Tai Po is in Primary One Admission (POA) School Net 84. Within the school net are multiple aided schools (operated independently but funded with government money) and Tai Po Government Primary School (大埔官立小學).

Several international schools also located in the district.

Schools
The Spanish Primary School, which has education in Spanish, English, and Mandarin under the National Curriculum for England, was organised by Adriana Chan. It opened in September 2017.

See also
 Yim Tin Tsai (Tai Po District), a village near Tai Po town
 Sha Lan Tsuen, a village near Tai Po town

References

Further reading
Cheung, Kwok-hung Stephen. "Traditional folksongs in an urban setting: a study of Hakka Shange in Tai Po, Hong Kong" (Archive). University of Hong Kong, 2004. - Information

External links 

 
Tai Po District